Cheryl McArton (born 25 April 1966) is a Canadian swimmer. She competed in the women's 4 × 100 metre freestyle relay at the 1984 Summer Olympics.

References

External links
 
 
 

1966 births
Living people
Canadian female swimmers
Olympic swimmers of Canada
Swimmers at the 1984 Summer Olympics
Swimmers at the 1987 Pan American Games
Pan American Games silver medalists for Canada
Pan American Games bronze medalists for Canada
Pan American Games medalists in swimming
Swimmers from Ottawa
Medalists at the 1987 Pan American Games
20th-century Canadian women
21st-century Canadian women